Sheth Nahalchand Lallochand High School (Also known as NL School), Malad West, Mumbai, India, is a co-educational Hindi and Gujarati middle school that was founded in 1942-1943 by the late Shri Nahalchand Lallochand in Mumbai. It is now administered by the Malad Kandivali Educational Society (MKES).

The school was accredited by the Maharashtra State Board of Secondary Education (MSBSE) in Pune since its incorporation in 1946. It comprises primary and secondary sections. Later on the administrations expanded its school section to English medium in the name of MKES and expansion continues to starting the Junior College in the name of the B.S.G.D Junior College and it went to the extent of starting a degree college under the Mumbai University in the name of Nagindas Khandwala College.
The school has well equipped laboratories for physics, biology and chemistry, as well as for languages and computer studies. The school has a large hall for cultural activities, guest lectures and facilitation ceremony.

Organization 
The Sheth Nahalchand Laloochand High School was founded in 1942-43 by the late Shri Nahalchand Lallochand in Mumbai. Within a span of 60 years, the organizations society has grown many educational institutes in its premises.

The first landmark achievement of the society was the starting of the Nagindas Khandwala College of Commerce and Arts. Founded in July 1983 by the society authorities, the college today has established itself as one of the prominent colleges of in the western suburbs It has been accredited by the NAAC and is affiliated with the University of Mumbai, The college started with only three divisions of FYBCom and now more than 5500 students are part of this institute and the various courses offered.

The junior college in the name of the B.S.G.D Junior College was also started along with the senior college in the same year. Its full name is the Bombay Suburban Grain Dealers’ Junior College of Commerce and Arts and is recognised by the MSBSE, Pune.

Alumni 
The N L High School Alumni Association maintains a database of ex-students. The primary objective of the association is to promote and maintain contacts among the ex-students and to help the school with matters concerning its promotion, development and welfare

References

External links
 Nagindas Khandwala College
 Educraft - About Sheth N L High School
 Descriptions & Locations  
 Details About Sheth N L High School

1940s establishments in India
High schools and secondary schools in Mumbai